Thelepogon is a genus of Asian, African, and Australian plants in the grass family.

 Species
 Thelepogon australiensis B.K.Simon - Queensland
 Thelepogon elegans Roth - Asia (India, Myanmar, Thailand, Java, Bali), Africa (from Guinea to Tanzania to Namibia)

 formerly included
see Schizachyrium 
 Thelepogon sanguineus -  Schizachyrium sanguineum

References

Andropogoneae
Poaceae genera
Grasses of Africa
Grasses of Asia
Grasses of Oceania